Odalengo Grande (Audalengh Grand in Piedmontese) is a comune (municipality) in the Province of Alessandria in the Italian region Piedmont, located about  east of Turin and about  northwest of Alessandria.

Odalengo Grande borders the following municipalities: Cerrina Monferrato, Murisengo, Odalengo Piccolo, Robella, Verrua Savoia, Villadeati, and Villamiroglio.

References

Cities and towns in Piedmont